Basil Nehill (10 June 1891 – 5 March 1942) was an Australian rules footballer who played for the St Kilda Football Club and Essendon Football Club in the Victorian Football League (VFL).

Notes

External links 

1891 births
1942 deaths
Australian rules footballers from Victoria (Australia)
St Kilda Football Club players
Essendon Football Club players
South Ballarat Football Club players